Radiation intelligence, or RINT, is military intelligence gathered and produced from unintentional radiation created as induction from electrical wiring, usually of computers, data connections and electricity networks.

See also
TEMPEST

References

Military intelligence
Radiation
Measurement and signature intelligence